is a 2010 Japanese action drama film directed by Katsuyuki Motohiro. It was released on July 3, 2010.

Cast
 Yūji Oda as Shunsaku Aoshima
 Toshirō Yanagiba as Shinji Muroi
 Eri Fukatsu as Sumire Onda
 Yūsuke Santamaria as Masayoshi Mashita

Reception
The film was the third highest-grossing domestic film at the Japanese box office in 2010 and, as of January 5, 2015, is the 67th highest-grossing film in Japan, with ¥7.31 billion.

References

External links

2010 action drama films
2010 films
Films based on television series
Films directed by Katsuyuki Motohiro
Japanese action drama films
2010s Japanese films